Auburn railway station is located on the Main Suburban line, serving the Sydney suburb of Auburn. It is served by Sydney Trains T1 Western and T2 Inner West & Leppington line services. The station serves one of the most multi-culturally diverse suburbs in the city.

To the west of the station lies Auburn Railway Signal Box, UGL Unipart's Maintrain maintenance facility, the Auburn Maintenance Centre and a Pacific National depot.

History
Auburn station opened in 1877. The station was rebuilt in 1913 and again in 1954 when the line was quadrupled.

The original subway underneath the platforms was closed in the 1990s, replaced by a new subway further east, which remains in use to this day.

The station was upgraded in 2007 with new lifts and tiling by Haslin Constructions for RailCorp at a cost of $5.5 million.

Platforms & services

Transport links
Busways operate two routes to and from Auburn station:
540: to Silverwater Correctional Complex
544: to Macquarie Centre

Transdev NSW operates four routes via Auburn station:
908: Merrylands to Bankstown
909: Parramatta to Bankstown
911: to Bankstown
S3: to Auburn Botanical Gardens

Auburn railway station is served by two NightRide routes:
N60: Fairfield station to Town Hall station
N61: Carlingford station to Town Hall station

Trackplan

References

External links

Auburn station details Transport for NSW
Auburn Station Public Transport Map Transport for NSW

Auburn, New South Wales
Main Suburban railway line
Railway stations in Australia opened in 1877
Railway stations in Sydney